Spencer Allen Tillman (born April 21, 1964) is an American former professional football player who played running back for eight seasons for the Houston Oilers and San Francisco 49ers in the National Football League (NFL).

College career

College football

Tillman was an All-American running back for the University of Oklahoma (1983–86) and was the captain of the 1985 National Championship team when it defeated Penn State, 25–10, in the Orange Bowl.

Tillman received several awards during his playing career, including UPI Player of the Year in the Big Eight Conference in 1982, Big Eight Football Newcomer of the Year in 1983 and MVP of the 1987 Orange Bowl. He was inducted into the Orange Bowl Hall of Fame in 2012.

Education

Tillman earned a bachelor's degree in journalism in 1986 and a bachelor's degree in communications in 1988 from the University of Oklahoma. He is a graduate of the Harvard Business School's & NFL's Business Management and Entrepreneurial Program.

Professional football

Houston Oilers

Tillman was drafted in the 1987 NFL Draft by the Houston Oilers as the 133rd overall pick in the 5th round. He played for the Oilers for two seasons (1987–88). Before an Oilers home game in October 1987, Tillman was riding in a Houston taxi cab when the driver was stricken and became unconscious. Tillman, who was sitting in the front seat, was able to stop the vehicle and administer CPR; after the driver was taken to the hospital for recovery, Tillman played in a 37-33 comeback win against the Atlanta Falcons.

San Francisco 49ers and Super Bowl XXIV

In the 1989 off-season, Tillman was traded to the San Francisco 49ers where he played for three seasons (1989–91). He was co-captain with Joe Montana and Ronnie Lott as part of the 49ers roster at Super Bowl XXIV when they defeated the AFC champion Denver Broncos.

Return to the Oilers

In 1992, Tillman was traded back to Houston, where he completed his playing career (1992–94).

Sports broadcasting

Broadcasting

After being drafted by the Houston Oilers in 1987, Tillman worked as an anchor and reporter at KPRC-TV during the seven-month off-season. His football and broadcasting careers developed in tandem as he hosted two radio sports-talk shows and was a reporter and anchor for a radio PM magazine in Oklahoma City prior to his television jobs.

CBS Sports

Tillman joined CBS Sports in 1999 as lead studio analyst for  College Football Today, the network's pre-game studio show. Tillman, who had served as WABC-TV's weekend sports anchor in New York from 1997 to 1999 and spent 10 years as a sports anchor for KPRC-TV Houston, was paired with Tim Brando at the College Football Today desk.  Tillman and Brando also broadcast regional NFL games for CBS from 2000–2003. In the first four years, Tillman and Brando were the eighth team of the NFL games for CBS; however, after week 2 Tillman and Brando were demoted to the ninth team of the NFL games for CBS and replaced by Bill Macatee and Jerry Glanville in the eighth team in 2003.

Tillman has also served for four years as a reporter for the Network's NCAA tournament coverage and is an anchor for regional broadcasts on Fox Sports Networks. He also served as host of DirecTV's "NFL Sunday Ticket."

Fox Sports

Starting in 2015 Tillman joined Fox Sports and reunited with Tim Brando on Fox CFB.

KGOW 1560 AM Houston

Tillman began duties as the voice of KGOW 1560 The Game, a Houston sports talk radio station, when the station launched its new format in August 2007.  His role includes reading promotional copy for the station, as well as weekly on-air time during the football season.

KTRK ABC13 Houston

Tillman is a current co-host of KTRK's Houston Texans Inside the Game, a thirty-minute weekly post-game recap and analysis program that typically follows the station's local newscast on game days.

Personal life
Tillman currently lives in Sugar Land, Texas, along with his wife, Rita, and their four daughters (Alisa, Blair, Mir, and Bailey).

References

External links
Spencer Tillman's profile for CBS Sports
Spencer Tillman's bio on Impact XXI
Still Scoring in the Red Zone

American football running backs
Houston Oilers players
San Francisco 49ers players
Oklahoma Sooners football players
Players of American football from Oklahoma
National Football League announcers
Television anchors from Houston
Sportspeople from Tulsa, Oklahoma
1964 births
Living people
College basketball announcers in the United States
College football announcers
Houston Texans announcers